Repairability is a measure of the degree to and ease with which a product can be repaired and maintained, usually by end consumers. Repairable products are put in contrast to obsolescence or products designed with planned obsolescence.

Repairability index 

Some private organizations and companies, mostly affiliated with the right to repair movement, assign repairability scores to products as a way of communicating to consumers how easily repairable the product is.

France 
Since 2021, all electronic devices sold in France have been required to report a repairability index which rates how repairable a product is on a scale from 0 to 10, primarily to prevent corporate greenwashing and encourage environmental transparency. Products are evaluated on 5 key areas: documentation, disassembly, spare parts availability, spare part pricing, and product specifics.

Limitations 
The repairability index scoring process isn't bulletproof, though—manufacturers currently self-report their indices to regulatory bodies with little to no government oversight ensuring the index was properly calculated. For example, smartphone and laptop manufacturers can obtain an extra point on the index just by providing consumers with information regarding security or software updates.

Effects 
Since France's recently enacted legislation requiring repairability indices, some positive effects have materialized. For instance, Samsung now offers consumers a free online repair manual for the for its Galaxy S21+ in an attempt to boost its repairability index. The enforcement of French repairability index laws pushed Samsung to release this manual, something consumers had been requesting for a long time; in contrast, there is no English repair manual for American consumers, as U.S. legislation doesn't incentivize Samsung to release such a manual. This french legislation has applied pressure to tech corporations to increase the repairability of their products and transition to a far more circular economy.

Notable Score 
Apple's iPhone 12 models scored a 6.0 and its iPhone 11 models scored a 4.5 out of 10 on the repairability index scale; the 2021 MacBook Air scored a 6.5 and the 2021 MacBook Pro scored a 5.6 on the scale. Google's Pixel 4a scored a 6.3. So far, the average repairability score has hovered around 5.4 out of 10.

See also
Availability
Circular economy
Design life
Durability
Interchangeable parts
Maintainability
Product life
Repairable component
Service life
Throwaway society

References 

Right to Repair
Consumer electronics
Maintenance